Artnant Tahirllari (born 12 February 1992 in Korçë) is an Albanian footballer who plays as a striker for Greek lower league side Kastoria.

Club career
In January 2015, Tahirllari joined Luftëtari Gjirokastër on loan from Skënderbeu Korçë.

Career statistics

References

1992 births
Living people
Footballers from Korçë
Albanian footballers
Association football forwards
KF Skënderbeu Korçë players
KF Elbasani players
Luftëtari Gjirokastër players
KF Adriatiku Mamurrasi players
Kastoria F.C. players
Kategoria Superiore players
Albanian expatriate footballers
Expatriate footballers in Greece
Albanian expatriate sportspeople in Greece